Brian Keith Bonner (born October 9, 1965) is a former American football linebacker in the National Football League (NFL) for the San Francisco 49ers and the Washington Redskins.  He played college football at the University of Wisconsin–Madison and the University of Minnesota.  After concluding his NFL career, Bonner went on to play four seasons for the Ottawa Rough Riders of the Canadian Football League (CFL). He split his final CFL season with the Saskatchewan Roughriders and the Shreveport Pirates.

References

1965 births
Living people
American football linebackers
Canadian football linebackers
San Francisco 49ers players
Washington Redskins players
Ottawa Rough Riders players
Saskatchewan Roughriders players
Shreveport Pirates players
Wisconsin Badgers football players
Minnesota Golden Gophers football players